The U.S. state of Illinois first required its residents to register their motor vehicles in 1907. Registrants provided their own license plates for display until 1911, when the state began to issue plates. , plates are issued by the Illinois Secretary of State.

Front and rear plates are required on most vehicle types, with the exception of motorcycles, motor-driven cycles, and trailers. Plates were issued annually until 1979; multi-year plates have been issued ever since. Plates belong to vehicle owners, so they can be transferred from one vehicle to another.

Early history: 1907–1939
Automobile owners in Illinois were first required to register their vehicles with the Secretary of State's office in 1907, paying a one-time registration fee of $2. Registrants were issued a numbered aluminum disc to place on their dashboard, but they had to provide their own license plates. Annual registration commenced in 1909.

The state began to issue license plates in 1911. Front and rear plates were required each year, along with an aluminum dashboard disc whose number matched the serial on the plate. The legislation authorizing the state issuance of license plates also provided for the registration and plating of motorcycles, and issued special licenses and plates to mechanics and chauffeurs.

Serials were all-numeric and originally ran to five digits. When 99999 was reached in 1914 and 1915, serials with one letter and four digits were issued. Six-digit all-numeric serials were introduced in 1916, followed in 1925 by seven-digit serials. Aluminum dashboard discs were discontinued after 1917.

Trucks received their own plates for the first time in 1920. Serials on these plates were all-numeric until 1930, when weight codes were introduced. Trailers received their own plates from 1924 onwards.

In 1927, the state issued its first graphic license plate, featuring an embossed state shape to the right of the serial.

Mid-century history: 1940–1978
With the entry of the United States into World War II, and the subsequent introduction of measures to conserve metal for the war effort, Illinois manufactured its license plates for 1943 from wood-based fiberboard instead of steel. This practice continued each year up to and including 1948, despite the war ending in 1945 with the surrender of Japan. The state reverted to manufacturing its plates from steel in 1949, although the 1950 and 1951 plates were instead manufactured from aluminum.

License plates were placed under the jurisdiction of the Secretary of State in 1953. The 1954 plates were the first to feature the "Land of Lincoln" slogan, which continues to be used today.

The 1956 (dated 1957) issue was the first Illinois license plate that fully complied with these standards: the 1955 (dated 1956) issue was 6 inches in height by 12 inches in width, but had non-standard mounting holes.

Multiyear baseplates: 1979–present
In late 1966 the implementation of five year license plates, which would use renewal tabs annually, was proposed. Their use would also aid police in identifying drivers because the books that listed all license plate numbers were not available until halfway through the year. With fewer plate numbers changing, the books would be relevant for longer periods of time. Paul Powell, the Illinois Secretary of State, rejected the proposal stating that any cost savings would be minimized by additional record keeping costs. He also mentioned that some multiyear plates used in other states were not satisfactory. Powell further reiterated his position the following month by mentioning a University of Illinois study which recommended the annual change in license plate colors as an incentive for motorists to pay the annual registration cost, and that the initial cost of the longer term plates would be much more than regular plates. The University of Illinois study mentioned by Powell was conducted in 1957 and 1958, and also recommended the addition of letters to the Illinois license plate. In 1969 Powell backed a plan to implement two-year plates, which would have cost twice the annual registration price, but the plan did not pass the legislature.

In January 1975 it was recommended that Illinois retain the practice of issuing annual license plates by an advisory committee to Secretary of State Michael Howlett. Two year license plates and a staggered registration system were studied by the committee, but both proposals were rejected. Despite this recommendation Howlett appointed a task force in April 1975 to study how to implement multiyear plates. At the conclusion of the study in September 1975 Howlett stated he would propose to the legislature that Illinois begin issuing multiyear plates validated by an annual renewal sticker. The plates were expected to last five years, and they were to be made of aluminum stock that was twice as thick as the current plates in order to make them more durable. With the 1976 license plates already in production, and the 1977 license plate contract already awarded, the implementation of a multiyear license plate system was delayed.

Issue of 1979
Legislation to implement a multiyear license plate was finally proposed in 1977. The bill to institute five-year plates passed the House Motor Vehicle Committee on March 16, 1977, and the state House on March 29, 1977. Alan Dixon, the Secretary of State, spoke in favor of passage of the bill. The Senate Transportation Committee passed the bill on April 28, 1977, and the full Senate on June 10, 1977. The bill was signed into law by Governor Jim Thompson on August 4, 1977. With the 1978 contract for license plates already awarded, multiyear plates would not be implemented until 1979. The cost savings from not issuing annual plates for the expected five year life of the plates was $21 million. One change made to the legislation before becoming a law gave the Secretary of State the discretion to determine how long the plates would last. This change would have long-term implications as there was not a statutory requirement to issue new license plates every five years.

The 1979 issue of new license plates was complicated by the fact that the state was converting to a staggered registration system at the same time it issued these plates. Under the multiyear system vehicle owners could obtain their new plates and register their vehicles for as few as nine months or as long as 23 months. At this time a full year registration cost $18, so the registration cost was prorated to the number of months that was chosen. A nine-month registration was $13.50 while a 23-month registration cost $34.50. Initially the month that a registration would expire was based upon the last two digits of a license plate number. For instance a plate ending in the number 11 allowed the vehicle owner to register for nine months ending on September 30, 1979 or they could choose an April 30, 1980 expiration. By limiting the choices for expiration to only two different months, the state ensured that registrations would be staggered.

Renewal stickers for the 1979 license plates were blue for 1979, red for 1980, green for 1981, brown for 1982, and orange for 1983.

The multiyear system also eliminated the need for current vehicle owners to replace license plates during the winter months as no registrations were set to expire in December, January, or February. Anyone who purchased a new or used vehicle in the winter months could still end up with license plates that needed to be renewed while it was cold outside.   Many other types of vehicles, such as taxis, limousines, dealers, etc. continued to be issued a new plate annually.

Issue of 1984
A new multi-year plate was introduced in 1984, replacing all the 1979 plates by the start of 1987. This plate consisted of embossed dark blue characters on a reflective white background, with a light blue band screened across the top containing the state name and the "Land of Lincoln" slogan. Serials on passenger plates issued to new registrants initially consisted of three letters and three numbers, while existing registrants with 1979 plates could retain the all-numeric and two-letter, four-number serials from these plates. After the three-letter, three-number format was completed in 1995, new formats were used consisting of one letter and up to six numbers.

Renewal stickers for these plates were as follows: purple for 1984, green for 1985, orange for 1986, blue for 1987, red for 1988, green for 1989, orange for 1990, maroon for 1991, white for 1992, blue for 1993, dark gray for 1994, red for 1995, white for 1996, green for 1997, gray for 1998, orange for 1999, blue for 2000 and finally red for 2001.

Issue of 2001
The new multiyear baseplate, which began to be issued in July 2001, was the first fully graphic passenger plate issued by the state of Illinois. The design, dark red characters on a background that faded from white at the top to dark blue at the bottom, was chosen by Internet voters from among nine different designs. The word "Illinois" was centered in a script font at the top, the "Land of Lincoln" slogan was once more centered at the bottom of the plate, and a single sticker well, half the size of the former well, was at the top right corner. In the center of the plate was a silhouette of Abraham Lincoln. Approximately 8.5 million passenger plates were scheduled to be replaced in a single year although replacement plates for all vehicle types was scheduled to take place over three years. Approximately 6.5 million passenger plates were made in Illinois at Macon County Rehabilitation Facilities, Inc. in Decatur, and another 2 million plates were made by Waldale Manufacturing Ltd. of Amherst, Nova Scotia, Canada in order to produce all of the passenger plates needed in a single year.

Issue of 2017
On November 15, 2016 Illinois Secretary of State Jesse White announced that new Illinois license plates would begin to be issued in 2017. As before, the new license plates were announced in conjunction with a multiyear replacement program. The largest change to the plate was the complete replacement of the background image. The image of Abraham Lincoln was moved to the far left, was changed to a dark gray color, only showed the left half of his face, and was nearly the entire height of the plate. Additionally, the rest of the background showed a blue sky above a partial Chicago skyline including the Willis Tower (formerly Sears Tower); a barn with a windpump; and the dome of the Illinois State Capitol building; all of which are all in white. The serial number characters remained in dark red, and the word "Illinois" along with the "Land of Lincoln" slogan were changed to a black seriffed font. The replating program is scheduled to take place over 10 years ending in 2026.

The plate was designed by staff of the Illinois Secretary of State's office, and drew criticism immediately, Blair Kamin of the Chicago Tribune calling the design "busy and banal". Two changes were made to the plate's design within the first year of issuance, both in order to make the serial more readable: the serial's layout was changed from AB1 2345 to AB 12345 (the space coming after the letters instead of after the first digit), before the image of Abraham Lincoln was changed from a dark gray color to a much lighter gray.

Temporary registration permits

1914 to 1982
The use of "License Applied For" windshield signs or similar devices can be traced back to at least 1914. Their use is likely back to 1911 when Illinois first began to provide state issued license plates. Defacing the signs was not taken lightly, and fines were handed out for tampering with them in even the most minor way. In 1933 many new cars were seen in Chicago without the required sign. There is little evidence of the use of "License Applied For" signs  throughout the 1940s, 1950s, and 1960s, but no other system of temporary vehicle registration is known for these decades. In the early 1970s Illinois vehicle owners were again receiving a small piece of cardboard with the words "License Applied For" to be taped to the inside of the vehicle's windshield until their license plates arrived in the mail. These signs continued to be issued until the early 1980s.

1983 to 2000
By 1983 this had transitioned to a Temporary Registration Permit on blue banknote paper for state residents that purchased new or used cars. These permits were supposed to be displayed in the lower right corner of the windshield. If new plates did not arrive in the mail within 60 days, the permit could be renewed. State residents who privately purchased a new or used vehicle were required to place a copy of their registration application in the lower right corner of the windshield and place a copy of the bill of sale in the lower left window. There has never been a charge for these permits.

Each of these permits had a unique number at the bottom left hand corner. In 1984 a prefix was added to the permit number so that the location of where the permit was obtained could be identified. The following prefixes were used: B for agents of the Secretary of State; CX for currency exchanges; DL for Illinois vehicle dealers; and RM for licensed remittance agents.

A revised permit form and new codes were used beginning in 1986. The primary change to the form was the expiration date went from being the same size as most of the text on the form to becoming the prominent feature with characters at least  in size. The acronym "EXP" (expires) immediately proceeded the Month, Day, and Year boxes at the top of the form. This change provided much better visibility of when a temporary permit expired. The revised codes were CUR for currency exchanges; DLR for Illinois vehicle dealers; MVS for agents of the Secretary of State; and REM for licensed remittance agents. The code and the unique serial number continued to appear at the bottom of the form.

By 1993 this system had been changed to an orange Temporary Registration Permit that showed both a large expiration date and a large temporary registration number. This paper tag was three inches wide by eight inches long, and it was supposed to be displayed in the back window of the vehicle. Problems with this permit, as well as the previous blue permit, were that they could easily be altered, their small size made them difficult to read, the numbers were not entered into police databases of plate numbers, and with the increased popularity of tinted windows the orange permits were often nearly invisible to other motorists, pedestrians, and the police. Originally these permits were valid for 60 days, but circa 1998 the length of time they could be used was extended to 90 days.

In June 1998 it was announced that new Temporary Registration Permits would begin to be issued in March 1999. Stickers, the size of regular license plates, were to be placed in the same location as normal plates. They were designed to be difficult to alter, would shred if moved, and therefore could not be transferred to another vehicle. This system was never implemented, and it wasn't until June 2001 that the orange temporary permitting form was replaced with an entirely revised permitting system. The last of the orange permits did not expire until December 31, 2001.

2001 to present

"Responding to complaints that temporary vehicle tags help criminals escape detection, Secretary of State Jesse White announced a $2 million program [on] Tuesday [June 19, 2001] to introduce tamper-proof temporary license plates that will allow police to know the identity of vehicle owners." He also called the black on yellow permit design, "One of the finest devised by man." These tags were the size of regular license plates, they incorporated a hologram in a strip across the entire plate, they had numbers the same size as a regular license plate, and they were immediately entered into law enforcement databases upon being issued. The expiration date was under a clear film to make them tamper-proof. Plates were valid for 90 days, which was the same length as the old system, and only a single permit for the rear of the vehicle was issued. The first day of issue was June 12, 2001 with these earliest permits being distributed to drivers license facilities, auto dealers, and currency exchanges.

The main problem with the new temporary permit, which remain in use today and are colloquially known as a temporary plate, is that the cardboard plate easily darkens when it gets wet, usually from rain, snow, or car washes, and consequently many begin to look old when left attached to a vehicle for as few as 30 days. Changes to the design since being issued include the format of the serial number being updated (see below), the plates red lettering has been revised, the state seal has been removed, and the boxes that indicate the month of expiration have been separated into four different groups. Regular updates to the year boxes are necessary to keep the plates current. All vehicle types use this temporary registration permit with the exception of motorcycles and mopeds which use a smaller permit with a slightly modified format than the standard permit.

Initially the format used for the permit was the same as that of a passenger car license plate: three numbers followed by a space and then four more numbers . For motorcycles and mopeds the format was three numbers followed by a space and then three more numbers . This led to there sometimes being the same number on both a permanent registration and a temporary registration. Eventually the inevitable mix-up happened, and a person with a permanent plate was pulled over for having the serial number of a temporary plate which was being looked for by the police. The proliferation of vanity plates and specialty plates, like the Environmental and Prevent Violence plates, some of which also carried the same serial number sequence as regular passenger plates, was also of concern.

The confusion caused by duplicate serial numbers led to a format change on the permits in the spring of 2003. The new format for passenger permits consisted of three numbers, a letter, and three more numbers ; the format for motorcycle and moped plates was similar but with two numbers before the letter instead of three . In both cases, T was the first letter used, followed by A, B, C etc., with I, O and Q skipped. With the introduction of the new formats, the red state seal between the sets of characters was removed.

Passenger baseplates

Pre-state plates

1911 to 1978

1979 to present

Non-passenger plates

Specialty plates
In addition to regular passenger plates, Illinois offers a large variety of specialty plates to include plates for colleges, professional sports teams, law enforcement, hunting (sporting), medical research, and many other causes. The cost of each set of plates differs depending on the type of plate and the required donation amount to annually display these plates.

Special Event plates
Special Event plates are available to civic organizations and other groups. The event must be open to the public and it must promote the interests of Illinois citizens. Plates may be displayed for the 60 days prior to the last day of the event and the basic cost per set of two plates is $10. The full cost of the plate is determined by the number of colors, and at least 50 sets of plates must be ordered. The Illinois Secretary of State must approve the design of all plates.

Culture references

Television and film
 In The Dark Knight Trilogy, The Illinois license plates were heavily used in all three Dark Knight films.

References

External links
Illinois Secretary of State License Plate Guide
Illinois license plates, 1969–present
More photos of Illinois license plates

Illinois
Transportation in Illinois
Illinois transportation-related lists